Wincentowo may refer to the following places:
Wincentowo, Kuyavian-Pomeranian Voivodeship (north-central Poland)
Wincentowo, Płock County in Masovian Voivodeship (east-central Poland)
Wincentowo, Wyszków County in Masovian Voivodeship (east-central Poland)
Wincentowo, Słupca County in Greater Poland Voivodeship (west-central Poland)
Wincentowo, Szamotuły County in Greater Poland Voivodeship (west-central Poland)
Wincentowo, Wolsztyn County in Greater Poland Voivodeship (west-central Poland)
Wincentowo, Lubusz Voivodeship (west Poland)